Colonel Christoph Graf (born 5 September 1961) is the 35th and current Commander of the Pontifical Swiss Guard, appointed by Pope Francis on 7 February 2015, replacing Col. Daniel Anrig.

Biography 
Graf was born in Pfaffnau, in the canton of Lucerne, Switzerland. He joined the Swiss Guard in 1987. In August 1999 he was promoted to sergeant, and later in 2000 he was promoted to sergeant-major, a position in which he remained until April 2009 when he was promoted to second captain. In October 2010, he was promoted to lieutenant colonel and vice commander of the guard, where he acted as a chief of staff and first adviser to the commander.

In late 2014, it was announced that Anrig would leave the position of commander after seven years of service. On 7 February 2015, Pope Francis appointed Graf as the new commander of the Pontifical Swiss Guard.

References 

1961 births
People from Willisau District
Commanders of the Swiss Guard
Living people